Loni also known as Loni-pravara is a town in Rahata taluka, Ahmednagar, Maharashtra, India. It is known for the biggest Shiv Jayanti Festival in the world. There are many colleges in this town. Climate is dry and moderate.

Lontek Temple 
This is a small temple on top of a hill with a large idol of Shiva.

Nizarneshwar Temple
This is a temple to Shiva at Nizarneshwar, 16 kilometers from Loni toward Sangamner.

Pravara Sugar Mill 
This is the first cooperative sugar mill in Asia, set up in 1950, established by Dr. Vithallrao Vikhe Patil.

References

Cities and towns in Ahmednagar district